Watrous may refer to:
 Watrous (surname)
 Watrous, Saskatchewan, a town in Canada
Arm River-Watrous, an electoral district in Saskatchewan
Humboldt-Watrous, an electoral district in Saskatchewan
Watrous (former electoral district) in Saskatchewan
Watrous Formation, a stratigraphical unit
Watrous railway station
Watrous Airport
Watrous, New Mexico, a community in the United States
 Watrous (La Junta), historic site and U.S. National Historic Landmark